Events from the year 1823 in Scotland.

Incumbents

Law officers 
 Lord Advocate – Sir William Rae, Bt
 Solicitor General for Scotland – John Hope

Judiciary 
 Lord President of the Court of Session – Lord Granton
 Lord Justice General – The Duke of Montrose
 Lord Justice Clerk – Lord Boyle

Events 
 14 January – the Plinian Society is inaugurated for students of natural history at the University of Edinburgh under the presidency of John Baird.
 7 February – the Bannatyne Club is inaugurated by Sir Walter Scott and others as a text publication society to print by subscription rare texts relating to the history, literature and traditions of Scotland.
 17 June – Charles Macintosh patents the waterproof material later used to make Mackintosh coats.
 18 July – Act for building additional Places of Worship in the Highlands and Islands of Scotland passed.
 November – the Highland Society’s Veterinary School, predecessor of the University of Edinburgh's Royal (Dick) School of Veterinary Studies, organises its first regular classes in Edinburgh under William Dick.
 Excise Act reduces duties on the distillation of whisky, encouraging its commercial production.
 James Smith of Deanston introduces an improved method of land drainage on slopes.
 First Hebrew congregation in Glasgow in modern times established.
 Rev. Dr. Henry Duncan completes reconstruction of the Northumbrian Ruthwell Cross.

Births 
 13 March – William Mackinnon, shipowner (died 1893 in London)
 31 March – William Hart, painter of the Hudson River School (died 1894 in the United States)
 1 May – Jemima Blackburn, née Wedderburn, watercolourist and illustrator, wife of Hugh Blackburn (died 1909)
 17 May – Henry Eckford, horticulturist (died 1905 in Shropshire)
 28 May – Henry MacDonald, soldier, Victoria Cross recipient (died 1893)
 2 July – Hugh Blackburn, mathematician (died 1909)
 11 July – John Stuart McCaig of Muckairn and Soroba, creator of McCaig's Tower, Oban (died 1902)
 26 September – Robert Boog Watson, malacologist and Free Church minister (died 1910)
 28 October – William Simpson, war artist (died 1899 in London)
 Thomas Bantock, businessman (died 1895 in Wolverhampton)

Deaths 
 28 March – Ilay Campbell, judge (born 1734)
 29 March – William Taylor, Moderator of the General Assembly of the Church of Scotland and Principal of the University of Glasgow (born 1744)
 16 June – Archibald Elliot, architect (born 1761)
 8 July – Sir Henry Raeburn, portrait painter (born 1756)
 29 September – George Beattie, poet (born 1786)
 George Finlayson, naturalist (born 1790; died at sea)

The arts
 February – a monument to poet Robert Burns (died 1796), designed by Thomas Hamilton, is opened in Alloway.
 Thomas Campbell's poem The Last Man is published.
 John Galt's novels The Entail, or The Lairds of Grippy, The Gathering of the West, Ringan Gilhaize, or The Covenanters and The Spaewife: a Tale of the Scottish Chronicles are published.
 Sir Walter Scott's novels Peveril of the Peak, Quentin Durward and St. Ronan's Well are published anonymously.
 William Tennant's poetic drama Cardinal Beaton is published.
 John Wilson's novel The Trials of Margaret Lyndsay is published.

See also 

 1823 in the United Kingdom

References 

 
Scotland
1820s in Scotland